Chawpi Tiyana (Quechua chawpi central, middle, tiyana seat, "central seat", hispanicized spelling Chaupitiana) is a mountain in the La Raya mountain range in the Andes of Peru, about  high. It is located in the Cusco Region, Canchis Province, Marangani District. It lies southwest of Kuntur Quta and south of Wiyachayuq.

References

Mountains of Peru
Mountains of Cusco Region